OMP Racing Spa (Officine Meccaniche Percivale) is a manufacturer of motorsport safety equipment and racing car accessories founded in 1973 and based in the area of Genoa, Italy.

History 

The company was founded by the three Percivale brothers (Claudio, Piergiorgio and Roberto) in 1973 and initially produced only rally car accessories such as rollbars and tail pipes. In the Eighties the company began producing equipment for drivers (suits, gloves, boots, helmets etc.). Since 2008 the company's majority share is owned by brothers Paolo and Alberto Delprato.

On 11th December 2019 OMP Racing announces it has acquired the majority shares in Bell Racing Helmets Group.

Sponsorships

Current

Formula One 
  Sauber (  Felipe Nasr,  Marcus Ericsson )

World Rally Championship 
  Volkswagen Motorsport (  Sébastien Ogier,  Jari-Matti Latvala,  Andreas Mikkelsen )
  Robert Kubica

World Touring Car Championship 
  JAS Motorsport (  Gabriele Tarquini,  Tiago Monteiro )
  Norbert Michelisz
  Stefano D'Aste
  John Filippi
  Dušan Borković

FIA World Endurance Championship 
  Af Corse (  Gianmaria Bruni,  Toni Vilander )
  Rebellion Racing

FIA World Rallycross Championship 
  Petter Solberg

IndyCar Series 
  Andretti Autosport (  Marco Andretti,  Ryan Hunter-Reay)
  Will Power

Blancpain GT Series 
  Alex Zanardi

Rolex Sports Car Series 
  Wayne Taylor Racing (  Ricky Taylor,  Jordan Taylor,  Max Angelelli)

Past 
Throughout its history, OMP has had sponsorship deals with the following race drivers and teams:

Formula One 

  Ayrton Senna
  Michael Schumacher
  Gerhard Berger
  Mika Häkkinen
  Riccardo Patrese
  Mauro Baldi
  Nigel Mansell
  Keke Rosberg
  Martin Brundle
  Alessandro Nannini
  Damon Hill
   Mario Andretti
  Jean Alesi
  David Coulthard
  Bruno Senna
  Rubens Barrichello
  Mark Webber
  Eddie Irvine
  Kimi Räikkönen

World Rally Championship 
  Henri Toivonen
  Markku Alen
  Björn Waldegård
  Alex Fiorio
  Juha Kankkunen
  Carlos Sainz
  Tommi Mäkinen
  Didier Auriol
  Richard Burns

World Touring Car Championship 
  Yvan Muller
  Robert Huff

See also 

List of Italian companies

References

External links
 

Auto parts suppliers of Italy
Automotive motorsports and performance companies
Automotive companies established in 1973
Italian companies established in 1973
Italian brands